Ivan Šijak (born March 23, 1969 in Belgrade) is a director, cinematographer, photographer and visual artist. Co-founder of the Mechanical Duck Creative Production. Lectures on visual effects for film, video, animation, and digital image at Faculty of Dramatic Arts in Belgrade and at the University of Arts. Co-founder of the Serbian Association of Cinematographers S.A.S. and a member of European Association of Cinematographers IMAGO

External links
 

Living people
1969 births
Film people from Belgrade